Waikaretu  is a rural community and caving area in the Waikato District and Waikato region of New Zealand's North Island. It is located 49 kilometres south-west of Tuakau.

Ninety minute guided tours are available, which are often wet and muddy. There is a visitor cafe, and there are several accommodation options nearby. A British analysis of TripAdvisor reviews in 2020 identified the cave as one of New Zealand's best secret tourist spots.

A local farmstay also provides guided horse treks.

Waikāretu translates as "waters of the kāretu grass"; wai means water; and kāretu is a sweet-scented grass.

History

20th century

The current Waikaretu settlement was established with the opening of a local school in 1924.

The Waikaretu War Memorial Hall was built in 1952. It has no Roll of Honour, but includes a plaque commemorating those who served in both World War I and World War II.

Philip and Anne Woodward moved to the area in 1976, purchasing a 204 hectare sheep and dairy farm that included Nikau Cave. They opened the cave to the public in 1994, after their farming lease on a neighbouring 242 hectare block ended and they could no longer make enough money from farming and shearing services.

21st century

By the 2010s the area featured several dairy farms, including the third-generation Whitford farm.

In 2016, the Overseas Investment Office granted a Chinese company, Weihai Station, approval to buy 595 hectares of coastal land. Part of the land will be used for a lodge and training facility, with the rest continuing to operate as a sheep and beef farm. The company gave Waikaretu School $25,000 in grants between 2016 and 2020.

Also in 2016, a secretive group began tunneling into the side of road searching for the skeletons of a mythical race of pre-Polynesian giants. They called off the search in February 2020, after iwi, academics and the landowner raised concerns about the dig.

Demographics
The SA1 area is part of the larger Port Waikato-Waikaretu statistical area.

Waikaretu had a population of 141 at the 2018 New Zealand census, an increase of 12 people (9.3%) since the 2013 census, and an increase of 30 people (27.0%) since the 2006 census. There were 51 households, comprising 69 males and 72 females, giving a sex ratio of 0.96 males per female. The median age was 35.6 years (compared with 37.4 years nationally), with 33 people (23.4%) aged under 15 years, 24 (17.0%) aged 15 to 29, 75 (53.2%) aged 30 to 64, and 9 (6.4%) aged 65 or older.

Ethnicities were 57.4% European/Pākehā, 48.9% Māori, 2.1% Pacific peoples, 2.1% Asian, and 2.1% other ethnicities. People may identify with more than one ethnicity.

Although some people chose not to answer the census's question about religious affiliation, 66.0% had no religion, 25.5% were Christian, 2.1% had Māori religious beliefs and 2.1% had other religions.

Of those at least 15 years old, 12 (11.1%) people had a bachelor's or higher degree, and 33 (30.6%) people had no formal qualifications. The median income was $32,600, compared with $31,800 nationally. 12 people (11.1%) earned over $70,000 compared to 17.2% nationally. The employment status of those at least 15 was that 63 (58.3%) people were employed full-time, 12 (11.1%) were part-time, and 6 (5.6%) were unemployed.

Education

See also

References

External links

Waikato District
Populated places in Waikato
Caves of New Zealand